Admiral of the Fleet Sir Algernon McLennan Lyons  (30 August 1833 – 9 February 1908) was a senior Royal Navy officer who served as First and Principal Naval Aide-de-Camp to Queen Victoria.

Lyons also served as Commander-in-Chief, Pacific Station, Commander-in-Chief, North America and West Indies Station, and then Commander-in-Chief, Plymouth.

He was the nephew of the eminent Admiral Edmund Lyons, 1st Baron Lyons, who served as Commander-in-Chief of the Mediterranean Fleet, under whom he served for a time, and the cousin of Richard Lyons, 1st Viscount Lyons, and Richard Lyons Pearson, Assistant Commissioner of the Metropolitan Police.

Family

Lyons was born at Bombay on 30 August 1833. He was the second son of Lieutenant General Humphrey Lyons (1833–1908) and his first wife, Eliza, daughter of Henry Bennett. Lyons's uncle was Edmund Lyons, 1st Baron Lyons, via whom he was the cousin of Richard Lyons, 1st Viscount Lyons. He was also the cousin of Richard Lyons Pearson, Assistant Commissioner of the Metropolitan Police. Lyons's grandfather was Captain John Lyons of Antigua.

Lyons was privately educated in Twickenham, Middlesex. He joined the Royal Navy in 1847.

Naval career

Lyons was appointed to the fifth-rate HMS Cambrian on the East Indies and China Station and then transferred to the second-rate HMS Albion, flagship of his uncle, Sir Edmund Lyons, who was Second-in-Command of the Mediterranean Fleet, in 1853.

Lyons was promoted to mate in October 1853 and transferred to the paddle frigate HMS Firebrand, which was engaged in the blockade of the Danube Delta, which was being held by the Russians at the start of the Crimean War. Lyons was promoted to lieutenant on 26 June 1854.

Lyons’s Rampage at the Danube

During the blockade of the mouth of the Danube, Captain Parker, Lyons's commanding officer, decided to attack the guardhouses and signal stations higher up the River, for these were responsible for the supply and communication of the Russian enemy. On 8 July, Captain Parker proceeded up the Danube, the banks of which were lined by Cossacks, who opened fire. When he reached the first Russian fort, defended by a stockade and a battery, Captain Parker was shot and killed by a Cossack.

When Parker was killed, Lyons took control of the British boats and proceeded to destroy not only the first Russian signal station, but the next four signal stations up the River, causing the Russians to flee. For this, he was mentioned in dispatches.

Lyons then became commander of HMS Firebrand for the bombardment of Sevastopol in October 1854, which was led by his uncle, Admiral Edmund Lyons, 1st Baron Lyons. When the British flagship, HMS Albion, was set on fire by the Russians, Lyons attached it, whilst burning, to his own ship and towed it to safety.

Kerch and Kinburn

In December 1854, Lyons's uncle Edmund Lyons, 1st Baron Lyons, became Commander in Chief of the Mediterranean Fleet and appointed Lyons as his Flag-Lieutenant. Lyons commanded the first-rate HMS Royal Albert, in December 1854 during the operations at Kerch in October 1854 and at the Battle of Kinburn in October 1855. He was promoted to commander on 9 August.

American Civil War

Lyons became commanding officer of the sloop HMS Racer on the North America and West Indies Station in May 1860. In HMS Racer he had the difficult task of protecting British merchant vessels seeking to evade the blockade being imposed by the United States Navy on Confederate ports.

Pacific Station

Lyons was promoted to captain on 1 December 1862. He became commanding officer of the corvette HMS Charybdis on the Pacific Station in January 1867 and commanding officer of the frigate  in a detached squadron in October 1872.
He was appointed Commodore-in-Charge at Jamaica in 1875. In April 1878 he became commanding officer of the armoured turret ship HMS Monarch in the Mediterranean Fleet in April 1878. He was deployed to Constantinople during his tour in HMS Monarch.

Admiral
Lyons was promoted to rear-admiral on 26 September 1878. He became Commander-in-Chief, Pacific Station, with his flag in the armoured ship HMS Swiftsure, in December 1881. On 27 October 1884, he was promoted to vice-admiral. He became Commander-in-Chief of the North America and West Indies Station in September 1886: in this position, his flagship was the central battery ship HMS Bellerophon, in September 1886.

Lyons was promoted to admiral on 15 December 1888 and appointed a Knight Commander of the Order of the Bath in 1889.

Admiral of the Fleet
He was appointed Commander-in-Chief, Plymouth, in June 1892. He became a Knight Grand Cross of the Order of the Bath in June 1897 and was promoted Admiral of the Fleet on 23 August 1897. In February 1895, he was appointed First and Principal Naval Aide-de-Camp to Queen Victoria.

He was a Deputy Lieutenant and Justice of the Peace for Glamorgan.

He retired on 30 August 1903.

Marriage

Lyons married Louisa Jane Penrice (bapt. 1853), daughter and heir of Thomas Penrice, at Pennard Church in Kilvrough on 3 September 1879: they had two sons and two daughters. Their residence was Kilvrough Manor in Glamorgan, where he died on 9 February 1908.

See also
Lyons family

References

Sources

 

William Loney Career History

|-

|-

|-

1833 births
1908 deaths
Royal Navy personnel of the Crimean War
Royal Navy admirals of the fleet
Knights Commander of the Order of the Bath
Knights Grand Cross of the Order of the Bath
Deputy Lieutenants of Glamorgan
Welsh justices of the peace